801 Grand High Rise Building (referred to as the 801 Grand Building and previously known as The Principal Building) is a 45-story skyscraper in Des Moines, Iowa, United States, operated and managed by JLL Americas and owned by Principal Financial Group (Principal Real Estate). The 801 Grand Building was constructed in 1989 and is the tallest building in Iowa. The building is part of a larger downtown campus run by Principal Financial Group and features a skywalk and an eight-sided copper pyramid at its top.

History 
Formal construction of the 801 Grand Building began in 1989, with Principal Financial Group serving as the developers and owners. The building was designed by Hellmuth Obata and Kassabaum. During the design phase of the building, the tower was designed to house office spaces and blend with the architecture of the local area. The tower cost $70 million to construct, with an additional $19 million parking lot being constructed and financed by the city of Des Moines. The building featured 705,000 square feet of office space, with 62 percent having been leased prior to completion of the building. In 1990, Democratic gubernatorial candidate Donald Avenson toured the nearly completed building, specifically visiting the 40th and 41st floors. In total, the project involved approximately 500 workers representing a dozen separate labor unions. 

The 45-story 801 Grand Building was completed and opened in 1991. The company JLL Americas serves as the buildings' manager. When completed, the  building overtook the Ruan Center as the tallest building in Iowa. The building's height was taller than One Kansas City Place ( tall) and the Metropolitan Square in St. Louis ( tall), making it the tallest building in the Midwest between Chicago and Denver. This record was broken by Omaha's First National Bank Tower in 2002.

In 2014, Principal Financial Group refitted their entire downtown campus with diode lights. Originally, the campus featured white lights but these were changed to LEDs due to issues with the white lights attracting and killing corn borer moths. This project was part of a $284 million renovation.

Design 
The 801 Grand Building follows a postmodern design. The tower's exterior is built out of granite with the upper levels featuring terraces and setbacks. This was designed to minimize the building's impact on the city's skyline. The granite used in the 801 Grand's exterior is specifically Venetian gold granite, which is known for its distinctive golden color. The stone used for the 801 was originally mined in Brazil, processed in Italy, and imported to Des Moines. Conversely, the windows are framed with a darker variant of granite. 

The top of the building is an eight-sided pyramid covered in copper. Originally, the designers intended the copper to turn to a verdigris color via oxidation. Furthermore, the original 1987 designs indicate a light green cap that was designed to blend the building's profile in with the rest of Des Moines's skyline. This was never achieved due to the relatively low levels of sulfur pollution in the atmosphere, which led to the copper pyramid oxidizing to a deep brown color.

The bottom three floors of the 801 Grand are designated for retail stores and restaurants, with the upper levels designated for office space. The third floor connects to a skywalk system and the top two floors serve as a private restaurant. The build was named one of the 50 most significant Iowa Buildings of the 20th Century by the Iowan chapter of the American Institute of Architects.

Notable tenants 
In 1993, the 801 Chophouse was established on the second floor of the 801 Grand. In 2022, the Des Moines Register listed the 801 Chophouse among the 12 best steakhouses in Des Moines. This restaurant serves as the chain's flagship and features a gallery of cattle-themed artwork. The steakhouse has been used as a de facto clubhouse during the Iowa caucuses, and it is commonly visited by politicians and news personnel.

In 2010, the First Church of Christ, Scientist relocated from their Des Moines building to the 801 Grand. In 2020, insurance company F&G moved their headquarters to the 801 Grand Building.

Gallery

See also
 List of tallest buildings in Iowa
 List of tallest buildings by U.S. state

References

External links
 Official website

Office buildings completed in 1991
Skyscraper office buildings in Des Moines, Iowa
Financial services company headquarters in the United States
Modernist architecture in Iowa
1991 establishments in Iowa
HOK (firm) buildings